The Dallas mayoral election of 2003 took place on May 3, 2003, to elect the mayor of Dallas, Texas. The race was officially nonpartisan. It saw the reelection of Laura Miller, who won the election by taking a majority in the initial round of voting, thereby negating the need for a runoff to be held.

Results

References

Dallas
Dallas
2003
Non-partisan elections
2000s in Dallas